Binnington may refer to:

People
Jordan Binnington (born 1993), Canadian professional ice hockey goaltender
Max Binnington (born 1949), Australian sprinter 
William Binnington Boyce (1804-1889), English philologist

Places
Binnington, North Yorkshire, a village in England
Binnington Carr Hoard

See also

Benington (disambiguation)
Bennington (disambiguation)
Pinnington, a surname

English-language surnames